Wellingholzhausen is a village, now part of the municipality of Melle, in the district of Osnabrück, in Lower Saxony, Germany. It is situated approximately 25 km southeast of Osnabrück and 25 km northwest of Bielefeld.

References

Former municipalities in Lower Saxony
Towns in Lower Saxony
Melle, Germany